TRYP By Wyndham (formerly known as Tryp) is a brand of independently owned hotels. Wyndham acquired TRYP in 2010, and has been promoting the brand internationally. As of December 31, 2018, it has 110 properties with 15,519 rooms. The brand is hosted by Spanish chain Mélia in Europe.

References

External links

 

Wyndham brands